Buchau Abbey, otherwise the Imperial Abbey of Buchau, was initially a community of canonesses regular, and later a collegiate foundation of secular canonesses, in Buchau (now Bad Buchau) in Baden-Württemberg, Germany. The abbey was a self-ruling Imperial Estate and its abbess had seat and vote at the Imperial Diet.

According to tradition, the monastery was founded around 770 on an island in the Federsee by the Frankish Count Warin and his wife Adelindis (still commemorated in the local Adelindisfest). The abbey was put on a secure financial footing by Louis the Pious, who in 819 granted the nuns property in the Saulgau and in Mengen. In 857, Louis the German declared it a private religious house of the Carolingian Imperial family and appointed as abbess his daughter Irmingard (died 16 July 866).

The abbey was initially a house of canonesses regular, but at a later date it was converted into a collegiate foundation of secular canonesses who belonged to various noble families of Swabia. In 1347, Buchau Abbey gained Imperial immediacy and the abbess was raised to the rank of Princess-Abbess. The abbey was an Imperial Estate and its abbess had seat and vote at the Imperial Diet.

Also in the 13th century the town of Buchau, which had grown up in the immediate vicinity of the abbey, gained the status of a Free imperial city after a long period of strife between the townspeople and the abbey. From then on and until 1803, Buchau Abbey and the Imperial City of Buchau, both self-governing entities fully independent of each other, were forced to coexist. Unlike most of the other Free Imperial Cities, Buchau was to remain Catholic in the course of the Reformation.

In 1415, the abbey became a secular foundation and from then on the congregation was to be composed of an abbess, twelve canonesses choral (choir women or Chorfrauen) and two chaplains. The abbess, as head of an Imperial Estate, had seat and voice in the Reichstag. Buchau Abbey had a small territorial base and in 1625 the lordship of Strassberg also became part of the abbey's possessions.

In the course of the secularisation of 1803, Buchau Abbey was dissolved like all the other Imperial abbeys and its territory and assets passed first to the prince of Thurn und Taxis, then to the Kingdom of Württemberg in 1806. The lordship of Strassberg however was annexed to the Principality of Hohenzollern-Sigmaringen.

The abbey church of Saints Cornelius and Cyprian, one of the first neo-classical buildings in southern Germany and still showing some late Baroque features, was built between 1774 and 1776 by Pierre Michel d'Ixnard as a conversion and refurbishment of a Gothic church. It includes stucco sculptures by Johann Joseph Christian.

References

Further reading
 Johann Daniel Georg v. Memminger: Stift Buchau, aus Beschreibung des Oberamts Riedlingen. Cotta, Stuttgart and Tübingen 1827 (full text on Wikisource)
 Rudolf Seigel (ed.): Die Urkunden des Stifts Buchau. Regesten 819–1500. (= "Inventare der nichtstaatlichen Archive in Baden-Württemberg"; Bd. 36). Kohlhammer, Stuttgart 2009 
 Bernhard Theil: Das (freiweltliche) Damenstift Buchau am Federsee. (= "Germania sacra", N. F., Bd. 32; Das Bistum Konstanz, Teil 4), publ. Max-Planck-Institut für Geschichte. De Gruyter, Berlin 1994.p. 422 
 Volker Himmelein (ed.): Alte Klöster, neue Herren. Die Säkularisation im deutschen Südwesten 1803. Große Landesausstellung Baden-Württemberg 2003; Ostfildern: Thorbecke, 2003  (exhibition catalogue and collection of essays)

External links

  Klöster in Baden-Württemberg: Adelige Chorfrauenstift Buchau -Geschichte
  Map of Swabia, 1789
  , by Bernhard Theil, 1994. 

Monasteries in Baden-Württemberg
Augustinian monasteries in Germany
Monasteries of Canonesses Regular
Christian monasteries established in the 8th century
8th-century establishments in Germany
Imperial abbeys disestablished in 1802–03
1340s establishments in the Holy Roman Empire
1347 establishments in Europe
1803 disestablishments in the Holy Roman Empire
Buildings and structures in Biberach (district)
Württemberg
Churches completed in 770
8th-century churches in Germany